{{Infobox language
|name=Kgalagadi
|altname=Kalahari
|nativename='SheKgalagadi|states=Botswana
|speakers=65,400
|date=2015
|ref=
|familycolor=Niger-Congo
|fam2=Atlantic–Congo
|fam3=Benue–Congo
|fam4=Southern Bantoid
|fam5=Bantu
|fam6=Sotho–Tswana
|iso3=xkv
|glotto=kgal1244
|glottorefname=Kgalagadi
|lingua=99-AUT-eh incl. varieties 99-AUT-eha to 99-AUT-ehc
|guthrie=S.311 (ex-S.31d)
}}

Kgalagadi is a Bantu language spoken in Botswana, along the South African border. It is spoken by about  people. In the language, it is known as Shekgalagari.

Classification
Kgalagadi (also rendered Kgalagari, Kgalagarhi, Kgalagari, Khalagari, Khalakadi, Kxhalaxadi, Qhalaxarzi, Shekgalagadi, Shekgalagari, Kqalaqadi) is most closely related to Tswana, and until recently was classified as a dialect of Tswana.

Dialects include Shengologa, Sheshaga, Shebolaongwe, Shelala, Shekhena, Sheritjhauba and Shekgwatheng.''

Notes and references 

Languages of Botswana
Sotho-Tswana languages